Priscilla Eve Frederick (born 14 February 1989 in Queens, New York) is an American-Antiguan athlete who specialises in the high jump. She competed for the United States until 2012, when she switched to Antigua and Barbuda, the country of her father's birth. She was raised and resides in the Sicklerville section of Winslow Township, New Jersey.

Frederick placed seventh in the US Olympic Trials. 

After beginning to compete internationally for  Antigua and Barbuda, Frederick won a silver medal in high jump at the 2015 Pan American Games. She defended her medal at the 2019 Pan American Games in Lima. In both Pan-American Games, she finished second behind Saint Lucian high jumper Levern Spencer.

Frederick's personal bests for the high jump are 1.91 metres outdoors (Toronto 2015) and 1.90 metres indoors (Staten Island 2016). Both are national records.

Frederick began coaching at Princeton University in 2016.

Personal life 
Loomis is Catholic and has been vocal about her faith.

Competition record

References

1989 births
Living people
Antigua and Barbuda female high jumpers
World Athletics Championships athletes for Antigua and Barbuda
Athletes (track and field) at the 2014 Commonwealth Games
Athletes (track and field) at the 2018 Commonwealth Games
Commonwealth Games competitors for Antigua and Barbuda
Athletes (track and field) at the 2015 Pan American Games
Athletes (track and field) at the 2019 Pan American Games
Pan American Games silver medalists for Antigua and Barbuda
Pan American Games medalists in athletics (track and field)
People from Winslow Township, New Jersey
Sportspeople from Camden County, New Jersey
Sportspeople from Queens, New York
Track and field athletes from New Jersey
American people of Antigua and Barbuda descent
Olympic athletes of Antigua and Barbuda
Athletes (track and field) at the 2016 Summer Olympics
Central American and Caribbean Games silver medalists for Antigua and Barbuda
Competitors at the 2014 Central American and Caribbean Games
Central American and Caribbean Games medalists in athletics
Medalists at the 2015 Pan American Games
Medalists at the 2019 Pan American Games
Track and field athletes from New York City

African-American Catholics